"I'd Be Better Off (In a Pine Box)" is a debut song written by Johnny MacRae and Steve Clark, and recorded by American country music artist Doug Stone. It was released in February 1990 as the first single from his self titled debut album. It peaked at #4 on the Billboard Hot Country Singles & Tracks chart and #5 on The Canadian RPM Tracks chart. It was also nominated for a Grammy Award for Best Male Country Vocal Performance.

Content
In this song, the narrator describes the anguish he feels knowing that the woman who left him has found love with another man and will never come back to him. His pain is so great he is considering suicide or murder to end it. Killing himself (and being shipped home in a pauper's casket) or killing them (and spending his life in prison) seem preferable to having "her and him together" on his mind.

Music video
The music video was directed by directing duo Deaton-Flanigen. The video features Stone singing the song in a motel room, with him hitchhiking for a ride. At the end of the video, it shows his former lover marrying another man. As Stone walks away, the woman takes a glance at him as the limo that she and her new husband is in leaves the church.

Critical reception
Brian Mansfield of Allmusic praised the song by calling it "a towering expression of self-pity that most singers could spend a career trying to top".

Chart performance

Year-end charts

References

1990 debut singles
1990 songs
Doug Stone songs
Music videos directed by Deaton-Flanigen Productions
Epic Records singles
Song recordings produced by Doug Johnson (record producer)
Songs written by Johnny MacRae
Songs about death